WKO may refer to

Austrian Federal Economic Chamber, an Austrian business community
WonderKing Online, an online role playing game
Württemberg Chamber Orchestra Heilbronn (Württembergisches Kammerorchester Heilbronn), a German orchestra